The Rowrah and Kelton Fell Railway was a standard gauge mineral railway in Cumberland, England, which was operated by William Baird and Company of Glasgow, Scotland.  It opened in 1877 and closed in 1926.

Route
The line ran south from Rowrah to Sheriff Gate where it branched into three.  One line ran south-west to Salter Hall Quarry; a second ran south to Stockhow; a third ran east to Kirkland, for Bankstead mine.  The Kirkland branch continued east to Kelton Fell and Knockmurton mines.  There were junctions with both the Whitehaven, Cleator and Egremont Railway and the Cleator and Workington Junction Railway near Rowrah.

Locomotives

Closure
Knockmurton mine closed about 1920; Bankstead mine closed 1921; Salter Hall quarry and the railway closed 1926.  The track was lifted in 1934.

See also 
 Rowrah railway station
 Arlecdon railway station

References

Sources

Further reading

External links
 Route in Google Maps

Rail transport in Cumbria
History of Cumbria
Railway lines opened in 1877
1877 establishments in England